Maria Atoll is an uninhabited small atoll of the Tuamotu group in French Polynesia. Maria's closest neighbour is the small atoll of Matureivavao of the  Acteon Group,  to the northwest.

Maria Atoll is oval in shape and bound by a continuous reef. It is 5.6 km long and 2.9 km wide. Its islands are low and flat and the lagoon is hypersaline.

This atoll is mostly called "Maria Est" in order to avoid confusion with another small atoll called Maria (Nororotu) in the Tubuai (Austral Islands) division of French Polynesia.

History
On some maps, Maria Atoll appeared as "Moerenhout Island".

Administration
Administratively, Maria Est belongs to the commune of the Gambier Islands.

References

Oceandots
Moerenhout, Jacques-Antoine. Voyages aux iles du grand Ocean
Tuamotu Seamount Trail

External links
Atoll list (in French)

Atolls of the Tuamotus